Richmond Hill in Richmond, London, is a hill that begins gently in its townside (north and north-east) through the former fields, orchards and vineyard to a point just within Richmond Park, the deer park emparked and enclosed by Charles I.

Topography
The straight southwest slope is steepest, falling away to Petersham meadows by the Thames and is a backdrop to Kingston and Richmond Bridges. Other returns to the flood plain are more complex across and beyond the park due to semi-natural ponds and dry and wet running vales feeding an easterly draining brook. The park has further upland – Wimbledon Common and Putney Heath – beyond. On, and gently scaling the steep fluvial terrace, is residential street Richmond Hill.  It is built up only on its higher (northeast) side – from the Richmond Bridge corner of town centre to the hilltop fronted by a cinema, homes, eateries and hotel-restaurants. It is one-way along its bulk.

Unique scenery 
The hill offers the only view in England to be protected by an Act of Parliament—the Richmond, Ham and Petersham Open Spaces Act passed in 1902—to protect the land on and below it and thus preserve the fine views to the west and south.  Two years before the wooded isle centrepiece of the view, Glover's Island, was bought by a local resident and given to the Richmond Corporation (Borough) in return for the latter noting against its records that it and its successors would not develop the isle.

Immortalised in paintings by John Wootton, Sir Joshua Reynolds and J. M. W. Turner, it was described by Sir Walter Scott as "an unrivalled landscape". It was this view that inspired the name of Richmond, Virginia, after the colonial founder of the city, William Byrd II, noticed a curve in the James River that remarkably resembled this meander.

Terrace Gardens and Terrace Walk 
The scenic panorama may be viewed from Terrace Walk, laid out near the top of the hill in the 18th century. This promenade surmounts the Terrace Gardens and both are Grade II* listed in Historic England's Register of Parks and Gardens of Special Historic Interest in England.

History
As the town of Richmond developed from its founding in the early 16th century, after Henry VII had established Richmond Palace, the attributes of the hill naturally attracted desirable residential and commercial development – with the result that many large, ornate properties came and went on the hill over the centuries, some of them with famous or notable persons as owners or occupiers.  Newer waves and subdivisions of these have continued, subject to external stylistic conformity. This three-times extended Conservation Area is "almost entirely surrounded" by others.

The original homes on Richmond Hill were set back in what is now The Vineyard, including Clarence House, Halford House, Michel's Almshouses and Vineyard House.

Richmond Hill shares with Ham and Petersham TW10 postcodes.

Etymology

The last two syllables (mond, hill) are an unlinked pleonasm (tautology) unapparent to native speakers. Mond and large hill are cognate. The origin is as a description of a place in France. This came across due to a noble style of at least 1071 Lord of (seigneur de) Richmond/t, associated with the Harrying of the North and thus Richmond, North Yorkshire. This settled into the title of Earl of Richmond briefly in its history borne by Henry VII of England. It was popularised from his local development of Richmond Palace to replace Shene Palace, precisely as the manor name had already changed and parish name would change. The associated settlement took the same name; for some years the two names were often used in conjunction (for example, "Shene otherwise called Richemount").

Footnotes

References

Further reading
 Richmond Local History Society (2019). The Streets of Richmond and Kew (3rd edition),  .

External links
 Turner at The Tate
 View from Richmond Hill  – BBC
  panoramic view – BBC
 photos of Richmond Hill  – BBC

Conservation areas in London
Hills of London
Parks and open spaces in the London Borough of Richmond upon Thames
Richmond, London
Streets in the London Borough of Richmond upon Thames